The ENMAX Centre (formerly Canada Games Sportsplex) is a 5,479-seat multi-purpose arena, in Lethbridge, Alberta, Canada.

It features a full-size ice rink, and a walking track. An outdoor sports field, with capacity for 2,000 people, is no longer adjacent to the center, it was made into a parking lot. In 1997, the  Servus Sports Centre (formerly the Lethbridge Soccer Centre) was built directly south.

It was built to host the 1975 Canada Games and is home to the Lethbridge Hurricanes, of the WHL.

The facility has hosted concerts, three-ring circuses, multicultural events, national curling championships, basketball events, banquets and skating events. Comedian Jerry Seinfeld performed to a sold-out crowd in 2011. Elton John performed at the ENMAX centre in April 2012.

Building enhancements
Renovations to upgrade the facility began in May 2009 and were completed in spring 2012. The total budget for the building enhancement was $33.722 million and was to be shared by the City of Lethbridge, a Municipal Sustainability Initiative Grant, and a Major Community Facilities Grant.

A $1,216,500 video scoreboard was installed and was funded by the City of Lethbridge, the Lethbridge Hurricanes, and savings to the original project budget.

References

External links
ENMAX Centre

Sports venues in Lethbridge
Indoor ice hockey venues in Canada
Western Hockey League arenas
Music venues in Alberta
1974 establishments in Alberta
Sports venues completed in 1974
Basketball venues in Canada
Continental Basketball Association venues